Apries is the name by which Herodotus (ii. 161) and Diodorus (i. 68) designate Wahibre Haaibre, a pharaoh of Egypt  (589 BC570 BC), the fourth king (counting from Psamtik I) of the Twenty-sixth dynasty of Egypt. He was equated with the Waphres of Manetho, who correctly records that he reigned for 19 years. Apries is also called Hophra in Jeremiah 44:30.

Biography 
Apries inherited the throne from his father, pharaoh Psamtik II, in February 589 BC. Apries was an active builder who constructed "additions to the temples at Athribis (Tell Atrib), Bahariya Oasis, Memphis and Sais." In Year 4 of his reign, Apries' sister Ankhnesneferibre was adopted as the new God's Wife of Amun at Thebes. However, Apries' reign was also fraught with internal problems. In 588 BC, Apries dispatched a force to Jerusalem to protect it from Babylonian forces sent by Nebuchadnezzar II (Jer. 37:5; 34:21). His forces quickly withdrew, however, apparently avoiding a major confrontation with the Babylonians. Jerusalem, following an 18-month-long siege, was destroyed by the Babylonians in either 587 BC or 586 BC. Apries's unsuccessful attempt to intervene in the politics of the Kingdom of Judah was followed by a mutiny of soldiers from the strategically important Aswan garrison.

According to classical historians, Apries campaigned in the Levant, took Sidon and so terrified the other cities of Phoenicia that he secured their submission. However, this supposed submission was likely short lived. 

While the mutiny was contained, Apries later attempted to protect Libya from incursions by Dorian Greek invaders, but his efforts backfired spectacularly, as his forces were mauled by the Greek invaders. When the defeated army returned home, a civil war broke out in the Egyptian army between the indigenous troops and the foreign mercenaries. The Egyptians threw their support to Amasis II, a general who had led Egyptian forces in a highly successful invasion of Nubia in 592 BC under Pharaoh Psamtik II, Apries' father. Amasis quickly declared himself pharaoh in 570 BC, and Apries fled Egypt and sought refuge in a foreign country. When Apries marched back to Egypt in 567 BC with the aid of a Babylonian army to reclaim the throne of Egypt, he was likely killed in battle with Amasis' forces. Alternatively, Herodotus (Histories 2.169) holds that Apries survived the battle, and was captured and treated well by the victorious Amasis, until the Egyptian people demanded justice against him, whereby he was placed into their hands and strangled to death. Amasis thus secured his kingship over Egypt and was then its unchallenged ruler.

Amasis, however, reportedly treated Apries' mortal remains with respect and observed the proper funerary rituals by having Apries' body carried to Sais and buried there with "full military honours." Amasis, the former general who had declared himself pharaoh, also married Apries' daughter, Khedebneithirbinet II, to legitimise his accession to power. While Herodotus claimed that the wife of Apries was called Nitetis (Νιτῆτις) (in Greek), "there are no contemporary references naming her" in Egyptian records. 

Eusebius placed the eclipse of Thales in 585 BC, in the eighth or twelfth year of Apries' reign.

Monuments
An obelisk which Apries erected at Sais was moved by the 3rd century AD Roman Emperor Diocletian and originally placed at the Temple of Isis in Rome. It is today located in front of the Santa Maria sopra Minerva basilica church in Rome.

See also
Twenty-sixth Dynasty of Egypt family tree
List of biblical figures identified in extra-biblical sources

References

570 BC deaths
6th-century BC Pharaohs
Pharaohs of the Twenty-sixth Dynasty of Egypt
Year of birth unknown
Pharaohs in the Bible